Rio Lajeado Grande is a river in the state of Rio Grande do Sul, Brazil.  The river empties into Rio da Várzea near São José das Missões.

Rivers of Rio Grande do Sul